The 2018 West Alabama Tigers football team represented University of West Alabama during the 2018 NCAA Division II football season. They were led by fifth-year head coach Brett Gilliland. The Tigers played their home games at Tiger Stadium and are members of the Gulf South Conference.

Preseason

Gulf South Conference coaches poll
On August 2, 2018, the Gulf South Conference released their preseason coaches poll with the Tigers predicted to finish in 1st place in the conference.

Preseason All-Gulf South Conference Team
The Tigers had seven players at seven positions selected to the preseason all-Gulf South Conference team.

Offense

Brandon Anderson – OT

Qua Boyd – TE

Call Dyer – C

Harry Satterwhite – QB

Defense

Darius Ellis – DL

Terry Samuel – LB

Special teams

Zach Gaines – P

Schedule
West Alabama 2018 football schedule consists of six home and five away games in the regular season. The Tigers will host GSC foes Delta State, Florida Tech, Valdosta State, and West Florida, and will travel to Mississippi College, North Greenville, Shorter, and West Georgia.

The Tigers will host two of the three non-conference games against Lenoir–Rhyne from the South Atlantic Conference (SAC) and Miles College from the Southern Intercollegiate Athletic Conference (SIAC) and will travel to Limestone, which is an independent team.

Three of the eleven games will be broadcast on ESPN3, as part of the Gulf South Conference Game of the Week.

Rankings

Game summaries

Lenoir-Rhyne

Miles

Valdosta State

at Limestone

at North Greenville

at Shorter

Delta State

at West Georgia

Florida Tech

at Mississippi College

West Florida

at Bowie State

References

West Alabama
West Alabama Tigers football seasons
West Alabama Tigers football